David Hanson or Dave Hanson may refer to:

Politicians
 David Hanson (politician) (born 1957), British politician, MP from Delyn, Wales
 Dave Hanson (politician) (born 1960/1961), Canadian politician, MLA for Lac La Biche-St. Paul-Two Hills, Alberta

Sportspeople
 Dave Hanson (footballer) (born 1968), former football striker
 David Hanson (ice hockey) (born 1954), ice hockey player, most famous for his role in Slap Shot

Others
 David Hanson (computer scientist), American software engineer
 David Hanson (producer), British television producer
 David Hanson (robotics designer) (born 1969), American sculptor and robotics researcher
 David J. Hanson (born 1941), American sociologist
 David Hanson, guitarist with progressive rock band GoodThunder

See also
 David Heinemeier Hansson (born 1979), Danish programmer
 David Hansen (disambiguation)

American teenager
 David Isaac Hanson (born 2004), McDonald's worker